Punoševac is a Serbian surname. Notable people with the surname include:

Dušan Punoševac (born 1991), Serbian footballer
Bratislav Punoševac (born 1987), Serbian footballer

Serbian surnames